The 2022 FedEx Cup Playoffs, the series of three golf tournaments that determined the 2021–22 season champion on the U.S.-based PGA Tour, was played from August 11–28. It included the following three events:

FedEx St. Jude Championship – TPC Southwind, Memphis, Tennessee
BMW Championship – Wilmington Country Club, Wilmington, Delaware
Tour Championship – East Lake Golf Club, Atlanta, Georgia

They were the 16th FedEx Cup playoffs since their inception in 2007.

The point distributions can be seen here.

Regular season rankings
The leading 10 players in the FedEx Cup regular season standings qualified for a share of the $20 million Comcast Business Tour top 10 bonus.

Source:

Playoffs eligibility list
With several players having been suspended from the tour mid-season after participating in LIV Golf events without receiving a release to do so, the tour created a FedExCup Playoffs Eligibility ranking list which excluded them. Ten players who finished inside the top-125 of the standard FedExCup Standings were excluded: Talor Gooch, Jason Kokrak, Matt Jones, Hudson Swafford, Matthew Wolff, Abraham Ancer, Carlos Ortiz, Brooks Koepka, Charles Howell III, Pat Perez. Three of these (Gooch, Jones and Swafford) failed in their attempt to gain a temporary restraining order to allow them to compete in the playoffs. Despite this, Gooch finished 29th in the standings after the first two playoff events, which would normally have qualified him for the Tour Championship.

FedEx St. Jude Championship
The FedEx St. Jude Championship was played August 11–14. 125 players were eligible to play in the event. Five players withdrew before the start, reducing the field to 120. Tommy Fleetwood (ranked 47) did not play due to personal reasons. Lanto Griffin (ranked 69), Daniel Berger (ranked 78), and Nate Lashley (ranked 98) did not play due to injury. Hideki Matsuyama (ranked 11) withdrew due to a neck injury. 69 players made the second-round cut at 138 (−2).

Will Zalatoris won the event, beating Sepp Straka in a playoff. The top 70 players in the points standings advanced to the BMW Championship. This included four players who were outside the top 70 prior to The FedEx St. Jude Championship: Lucas Glover (ranked 121st to 34th), Adam Scott (77 to 45), Andrew Putnam (87 to 47), and Wyndham Clark (79 to 70). Four players started the tournament within the top 70 but ended the tournament outside the top 70, ending their playoff chances: Anirban Lahiri (ranked 63rd to 71st), John Huh (67 to 73), Brendon Todd (68 to 74), and Lanto Griffin (69 to 77).

Par 70 course

BMW Championship
The BMW Championship was played August 18–21. 70 players were eligible to play in the event. There was no second-round cut. Tommy Fleetwood and Cameron Smith did not play, reducing the field to 68.

Patrick Cantlay won the event, beating Scott Stallings by one stroke. The top 30 players in the points standings advanced to the Tour Championship. This included four players who were outside the top 30 prior to the BMW Championship: Scott Stallings (ranked 46th to 12th), Lee Kyoung-hoon (33 to 26), Adam Scott (45 to 29), and Aaron Wise (31 to 30). Four players started the tournament within the top 30 but ended the tournament outside the top 30, ending their playoff chances: Tom Kim (25 to 34), Davis Riley (26 to 35), Kevin Kisner (28 to 38), and J. J. Spaun (30 to 33).

Par 71 course

Tour Championship
The Tour Championship was played August 25–28. 30 golfers qualified for the tournament. Will Zalatoris did not play due to a back injury, reducing the field to 29. There was no second-round cut. 

Players were allocated a starting score relative to par based on their position in the standings after the BMW Championship. The points leader started the tournament at 10 under par, number two at 8 under par, number three at 7 under par, number four at 6 under par and number five at 5 under par. Players ranked 6 to 10 started at 4 under par, 11 to 15 at 3 under par, 16 to 20 at 2 under par, 21 to 25 at 1 under par and 26 to 30 start at even par. The winner of the Tour Championship wins the FedEx Cup. For the purposes of the Official World Golf Ranking, points are awarded based on aggregate scores (total strokes taken, ignoring any starting scores). 

Rory McIlroy won by one stoke over Im Sung-jae and Scottie Scheffler. He also had the best 72-hole aggregate score of 263. It was his third Tour Championship win and third FedEx Cup win.

Par 70 course

Table of qualified players
Table key:

* First-time Playoffs qualifier
DNP = Did not play
WD = Withdrew

References

External links
Coverage on the PGA Tour's official site

FedEx Cup
PGA Tour
PGA Tour events
FedEx Cup Playoffs
FedEx Cup Playoffs
FedEx Cup Playoffs